Eldar "Ell" Parviz oglu Gasimov (born 4 June 1989) is an Azerbaijani singer who successfully represented Azerbaijan at the Eurovision Song Contest 2011 in the music duo Ell & Nikki with Nigar Jamal. He co-hosted the Eurovision Song Contest 2012 held in Baku, Azerbaijan with Leyla Aliyeva and Nargiz Birk-Petersen.

Early life
Eldar Gasimov is the great-grandson of Azerbaijani actor couple Honoured Artist of Azerbaijan Abbas Mirza Sharifzadeh and People's Artist of USSR Marziyya Davudova, and the grandson of People's Artist of Azerbaijan actress Firangiz Sharifova. Gasimov began singing when he was very young and has taken part in several concerts in various cities of Azerbaijan and Russia. Between 2001 and 2005 he received professional training in music and learned to play the piano.

Eldar Gasimov graduated from Baku Slavic University with a double major in international relations and regional geography. Since 2010, he has been a graduate student of international relations at the same university. Eldar Gasimov speaks Russian and German fluently and is also proficient in English.

Career

Eurovision Song Contest 2011
Gasimov took part in the Azerbaijani national selection, Milli Seçim Turu 2011. Gasımov's first appearance was in Heat 6, placing second with 10 points, behind winner Ilgara Ibrahimova with 12 points with both qualifying to the semi-final. Gasimov qualified from the semi-final along with four other artists to the final on 11 February 2011, where he and Nigar Jamal won the right to represent Azerbaijan at the Eurovision Song Contest 2011 in Düsseldorf, Germany in May 2011. They sang under the pseudonym Ell & Nikki the song "Running Scared" written by Stefan Örn and Sandra Bjurman from Sweden and Iain Farquharson from the UK, which won the competition with 221 points.

2011–present: After Eurovision

After winning the Eurovision Song Contest 2011 Gasimov and Jamal got to travel to a number of countries and perform their winning entry. In Azerbaijan 15,000 postage stamps in the denomination of 1 Azerbaijani manat were printed. The production of postage stamps in Azerbaijan were in dedication of Eldar and Nigar's victory at 2011 contest. In 2012, Eldar Gasimov was among five musicians from Azerbaijan chosen as the jury in the Danish national selection of the 2012 Eurovision contestant.

In January 2012, he released his first post-Eurovision song called "Birlikda nahayat" ("At last together"). Gasimov was one of the hosts of the Eurovision Song Contest 2012 held in Baku, Azerbaijan after his win the year before.

On 17 July 2012, Gasimov released the acoustic version of his new single I'm Free. The official video was released in September 2012. The original version of the track had been featured with famous Azerbaijani DJ/producer ALIGEE. The track had been produced in a studio of AzeriLife Music Entertainment by the executive record and music producer Farid (a.k.a. Phareed) Mammadov and Ali (a.k.a. ALIGEE) Abasbeili.

In October 2012, Eldar Gasimov announced on his social network account that he had been hired by the Baku Slavic University, where he had received his master's degree, to teach a course in international relations.

The Voice of Azerbaijan 
In 2021-2022 he mentored in the second season of The Voice of Azerbaijan. His contestant Nadir Rustamlli won and presented the country in the Eurovision Song Contest 2022, where he got 16th place.

Discography

Singles

See also
Azerbaijani pop music
Azerbaijani jazz

References

External links

1989 births
Living people
Eurovision Song Contest entrants for Azerbaijan
21st-century Azerbaijani male singers
Eurovision Song Contest entrants of 2011
English-language singers from Azerbaijan
Musicians from Baku
Azerbaijani people of Tatar descent
Baku Slavic University alumni